The 2011 São Tomé (Island or Regional) First Division took place that season.  The club had 12 clubs and not until 2016 when they had 12 clubs again, 10 clubs appeared for the next few seasons. A total of 126 matches were played and 313 goals were scored.  Vitória Riboque won the season's title after finishing with 47 points and participated in the 2011 National Championship later in the year.

Overview
Neves and Ribeira Peixe were promoted into the Premier Division from the Second and spent only a season.

Guadalupe, Neves, Ribeira Peixe and Santana were relegated and participated in the regional Second Division in the following season.  Guadalupe did not return to the Premier Division until 2013 and Neves and Santana until 2014.

Sporting Praia Cruz scored the most goals numbering 41, second was 6 de Setembro with 39, 3rd was Vitória Riboque with 35 and fourth was UDRA with 31.  Santana scored the least with 15, the second least was UDESCAI with 16 and Ribeira Peixe with 17. On the opposites, Ribeira Peixe conceded the most with 48, followed by Santana with 47 and Neves with 37,  Vitória Riboque conceded the least with 15 and Oque del Rei the second least with 16.

Between July 10 and August 14, there were no competitions due to the first (17 July) and second (7 August) rounds of the presidential elections that took place in the country, the 25 July one due to the regional cup competition that took place.

Teams

League table

References

Football competitions in São Tomé and Príncipe
Sao Tome
Sao Tome First Division